Khanqah al-Farafira is a 13th-century Sufi monastery located in "al-Farafira district at the heart of the Ancient City of Aleppo, Syria. The khanqah was built in 1237 by the efforts of Dayfa Khatun the regent ruler of Aleppo from 1237 to 1244 and the wife of Az-Zahir Ghazi. The building was a centre for sufis and dervishes. The original name of the building was ar-Ribat al-Nasiri.

Architecture
The entrance of the building is topped with oriental motifs and decorated with traditional Islamic muqarnas. The entrance is followed with a corridor leading to the main courtyard. The square-shaped courtyard has a fountain in the centre used for wudu. To the east of the main courtyard, there is a narrow corridor leads to a small courtyard surrounded with an iwan and three rooms for the visitors of the khanqah. The western staircase of the main courtyard leads up to the roof where many rooms are designated to host the sufi pilgrims and dervishes. At the southern part of the main courtyard, there is a domed mihrab built from marble on an octagonal base and decorated with traditional muqarnas fortified with four pillars. The mihrab is surrounded with two columns decorated and topped with coloured marble decorations.

During the French mandate of Syria, the building was used as a shelter for the Africans who were brought from their countries to serve in the French army.

Khanqah al-Farafira is one of the few surviving khanqahs in the history of Islamic architecture.

References

Religious buildings and structures completed in 1237
Museums in Syria
Religion in Syria
Buildings and structures in Aleppo